Universal Congress Of are an American jazz ensemble from Los Angeles, formed in 1986.

History 
The project was started by Joe Baiza and continued to develop his own fusion of free jazz and punk rock after his previous band, Saccharine Trust, went on hiatus. Congress' approach to free jazz has earned them comparisons to Ornette Coleman and James Blood Ulmer, while the group themselves have pointed to Albert Ayler as a primary source of inspiration. The band's name was chosen "to reflect the open-ended nature of its music."

The original line-up consisted of Baiza, Ralph Gorodetsky (bass), Jason Kahn (drums), Steve Moss (saxophone). Moss had played in an earlier incarnation of Baiza's previous band, Saccharine Trust.

Legacy 
In an issue of Mountain Bike, bassist Tim Commerford of Rage Against the Machine spoke of his admiration of the band's funky and jazz tinged style.

Discography 
Studio albums
Joe Baiza & The Universal Congress Of (1987, SST)
Prosperous and Qualified (1988, SST)
The Sad and Tragic Demise of Big Fine Hot Salty Black Wind (1991, Enemy)
The Eleventh-Hour Shine-On (1992, Enemy)

EPs
This Is Mecolodics (1988, SST)

Live albums
Sparkling Fresh (1998, Hazelwood)

References

External links 
[ allmusic Biography]

American jazz ensembles from California
Musical groups established in 1986
Musical groups from Los Angeles
Enemy Records artists
SST Records artists
1986 establishments in California
Jazz musicians from California